The 1998 Scottish League Cup final was played on 29 November 1998 at Celtic Park in Glasgow and was the final of the 52nd Scottish League Cup. The final was contested by Rangers and St Johnstone. Rangers won the match 2–1, with goals from Stéphane Guivarc'h and Jörg Albertz.

Match details

Teams

1998
League Cup Final
Scottish League Cup Final 1998
Scottish League Cup Final 1998
1990s in Glasgow
Scottish League Cup Final